is a Japanese voice actress from Yasu, Shiga Prefecture. She is affiliated with 81 Produce. She has been known for her voice role as Hamtaro.

Voice roles
6 Angels (movie) (Rynk)
A Little Snow Fairy Sugar (Lancelot the Turtle)
 Aesop World (Picco)
Assassination Classroom (Kunudon)
Battle B-Daman (Bull Borgnine)
Cosmic Baton Girl Comet-san (Tsuyoshi)
Dokkiri Doctor (Kaori Tajima)
Escaflowne (Hitomi Kanzaki (child))
éX-Driver (OVA)(Make)
Gakko no Kaidan (Keiichiro Miyanoshita)
Glass Mask (TV)(Kazu (ep.16))
Gravion (Anna)
Gravion Zwei (Anya)
Hayate × Blade (Drama CD) (Hayate Kurogane)
Hare Tokidoki Buta (Tama-chan)
Inai Inai Baa! (U-tan)
ICE (Satsuki)
Jigoku Shoujo Futakomori (Nene Chiwaki (ep.17))
Kirby and the Forgotten Land (Elfilin)
Kyoro-chan (Mikken)
Les Misérables: Shōjo Cosette (Azelma)
Mahō Shōjo Ikusei Keikaku (Fav)
Mirmo de Pon! (Pappi)
Momoko, Kaeru no Uta ga Kikoeru yo. (Momoko Kuramoto)
Nekojiru Gekijo (TV) as Ponkichi
One Piece as Leo
Otogizōshi (Brother (ep.16))
Ouran High School Host Club (Kirimi Nekozawa, Tonji's sister (ep.11))
Pokémon Mystery Dungeon: Explorers of Time and Explorers of Darkness (Pochama)
Pokémon—Zoroark: Master of Illusions - Zorua
Powerpuff Girls (Bubbles (Japanese UG dub))
Puyo Puyo~n (Carbuncle)
Prétear (C-ko (ep.1))
Recess (Cornchip Girl and Guru Kid)
Sgt. Frog (Nuii of Shurara Corps (ep.188))
Shugo Chara! (Hinamori Ami)
Shugo Chara!! Doki- (Hinamori Ami)
Takoyaki Mant-Man (Tenten)
Tamagotchi: The Movie (movie) (Ms. Perfect)
Taro the Space Alien (Yuji)
Tokyo Mew Mew (Momoka (ep.35))
Tottoko Hamtaro (Hamtaro)
Tottoko Hamtaro: Hamutaro no Otanjoubi ~Mama wo Tazunete Sanzen Techitechi~ (OAV) (Hamtaro)
Tottoko Hamtaro: Hamu Hamu Land Daibouken (movie) (Hamtaro)
Tottoko Hamtaro: Ham Ham Ham~Jya! Maboroshi no Princess (movie) (Hamtaro)
Tottoko Hamtaro: Ham Ham Grand Prix Aurora Tani no Kiseki (movie) (Hamtaro)
Tottoko Hamtaro: Hamutaro to Fushigi no Oni no Ehonto (movie) (Hamtaro)
Hamster (Yuri's World)
Yakitate!! Japan (Little Girl (ep.63))
Zoids: Genesis (Ra Muu (ep.16-17))

External links
 at 81 Produce 

Living people
Voice actors from Shiga Prefecture
81 Produce voice actors
Japanese voice actresses
Year of birth missing (living people)
Voice actresses from Shiga Prefecture